Zenovka is a Russian surname. Notable people with the surname include:

Eduard Zenovka (born 1969), Soviet modern pentathlete
Irina Zenovka (born 1972), Russian choreographer of rhythmic gymnastics, wife of Eduard

See also
 Zenkovka

Russian-language surnames